The 1998 Canoe Slalom World Cup was a series of five races in 4 canoeing and kayaking categories organized by the International Canoe Federation (ICF). It was the 11th edition. The series consisted of 4 regular world cup races and the world cup final.

Calendar

Final standings 

The winner of each world cup race was awarded 30 points. The points scale reached down to 1 point for 20th place in the men's K1, while in the other three categories only the top 15 received points (with 6 points for 15th place). Only the best two results of each athlete from the first 4 world cups plus the result from the world cup final counted for the final world cup standings. Furthermore, an athlete or boat had to compete in the world cup final in order to be classified in the world cup rankings.

Results

World Cup Race 1 

The first world cup race of the season took place at the Ondrej Cibak Whitewater Slalom Course in Liptovský Mikuláš, Slovakia from 13 to 14 June.

World Cup Race 2 

The second world cup race of the season took place at the Tacen Whitewater Course, Slovenia from 20 to 21 June.

World Cup Race 3 

The third world cup race of the season took place at the Augsburg Eiskanal, Germany from 27 to 28 June.

World Cup Race 4 

The fourth world cup race of the season took place in Wausau, Wisconsin from 31 July to 2 August.

World Cup Final 

The final world cup race of the season took place at the Segre Olympic Park in La Seu d'Urgell, Spain from 11 to 13 September.

References

External links 
 International Canoe Federation

Canoe Slalom World Cup
1998 in canoeing